The 1984–85 season was Blackpool F.C.'s 77th season (74th consecutive) in the Football League. They competed in the 24-team Division Four, then the bottom tier of English league football, finishing second. As a result, they were promoted to Division Three. As of 2020, this remains the last time they achieved automatic promotion.

John Deary was the club's top scorer, with fifteen goals (thirteen in the league and two in the League Cup).

Table

References

English football clubs 1984–85 season
1984-85